Frederick Albert Hayes (born circa 1895) was an English footballer who played at centre-forward for Port Vale and Tranmere Rovers in the 1920s.

Career
Hayes played for Liverpool Badgers before joining Port Vale in June 1920. After making his debut in a 4–0 defeat by Birmingham at St Andrew's on 2 May on the penultimate Second Division game of the 1920–21 season. He played two games in the 1921–22 season before departing The Old Recreation Ground to return to Merseyside with Tranmere Rovers.

Career statistics
Source:

References

Footballers from Liverpool
English footballers
Association football forwards
Port Vale F.C. players
Tranmere Rovers F.C. players
English Football League players
1890s births
Year of death missing